Battle of Tal Afar may refer to:
 Battle of Tal Afar (2005), also known as Operation Restoring Rights, by U.S. and Iraq against Al Qaeda
 Battle of Tal Afar (2017), by Iraq against ISIL

See also
 Battle of Nineveh (disambiguation)
 Battle of Mosul (disambiguation)